Yemelyanovskaya is a rural locality (a village) in Spasskoye Rural Settlement, Tarnogsky District, Vologda Oblast, Russia. The population was 18 as of 2002.

Geography 
Yemelyanovskaya is located 57 km northwest of Tarnogsky Gorodok (the district's administrative centre) by road. Marachevskaya is the nearest rural locality.

References 

Rural localities in Tarnogsky District